One Crowded Night is a 1940 drama film directed by Irving Reis.

Cast
 Billie Seward as Gladys
 William Haade as Joe Miller
 Charles Lang as Fred Matson (Navy deserter prisoner)
 Adele Pearce as Ruth Matson 
 J.M. Kerrigan as Brother 'Doc' Joseph (patent medicine peddler)
 Paul Guilfoyle as Jim Andrews
 Anne Revere as Mae Andrews
 Gale Storm as Annie Mathews
 Dick Hogan as Vince Sanders
 George Watts as Pa Mathews
 Emma Dunn as Ma Mathews
 Don Costello as Lefty (gunman chasing Jim Andrews)
 Gaylord Pendleton as Mat Denlen (Gunman chasing Jim Andrews)
 Casey Johnson as Bobby Andrews
 Harry Shannon as Detective Lt. McDermott

References

External links 
One Crowded Night at IMDb

1940 films
American drama films
1940 drama films
Films with screenplays by Richard Collins
Films with screenplays by Arnaud d'Usseau
Films directed by Irving Reis
Films produced by Cliff Reid
American black-and-white films
1940s American films